Marcelino Da Costa Fernandes or Lino (born September 15, 1983) is a football player. He is the current forward for the Timor-Leste national football team. Starting debut against the Philippine diajang AFF Suzuki Cup qualifying

References

1983 births
Living people
East Timorese footballers
Association football defenders
Timor-Leste international footballers
A.D. Dili Leste players